The Picchetti Winery, also known as the Picchetti Ranch, is a winery located at 13100 Montebello Rd., Cupertino, California in the Picchetti Ranch Open Space Preserve. The Picchetti brothers, Secondo and Vincenzo, for whom the ranch was named, were among the earliest settlers to plant grapes on this ridge, which they named "Monte Bello" or "beautiful mountain." This ridge was later to become one of Santa Clara County's important vineyard areas.

The complex is composed of seven buildings built between 1880 and 1920, which retain their original design details. 
Vincenzo and Secondo Picchetti settled on Montebello ridge in 1877 and purchased an initial  for $1,500. The first house on the property was built around 1882, followed by a larger residence in 1886. Both homes, plus the stone winery, were in the Picchetti family until 1976.

The first grapes planted were Zinfandel, Carignane and Petite Sirah. At first, the brothers only sold the grapes to local wineries, but in 1896 they decided to make their own wine, becoming one of the early wineries in California (California Bonded Winery number 148).

Instrumental in establishing the Montebello School in 1892, Vincenzo served on the first school board and supplied a room for a teacher at his ranch. Vineyards were the life blood of the town of Cupertino's early economy, although grape parasites destroyed many of the vines in the region in the 1890s.

Upon Vincenzo's death in 1904, sons Antone and John ran the winery and ranch. The front porch of the main house was once screened in and acted as an aviary. Later John had numerous aviaries built - one of those aviaries still stands in front of the homestead house.

Commercial wine production ceased in 1963 due to a lack of profitability, and much of the land was sold to the Midpeninsula Regional Open Space District. The Santa Clara County Historical Heritage Commission provided funding for the restoration of the winery building.  The land produced wine from 1982 to 1998 as Sunrise Winery.  In 1998, Leslie Pantling took over the winery and production has resumed to the tune of about 9,000 cases per year under the "Leslie's Estate" label.

Today, the Picchetti ranch and winery on Montebello Road remain as evidence of a thriving viticulture industry in early Cupertino.

Picchetti Ranch Open Space Preserve
The  Picchetti Ranch Open Space Preserve was acquired by the Midpeninsula Regional Open Space District in 1976.  The winery is leased back to a private party.  The preserve is partially surrounded by Stevens Creek County Park, and features  of trails restricted to pedestrians and horses.

References

External links

Picchetti Brothers Winery

Industrial buildings completed in 1880
Wineries in Santa Cruz Mountains
Agricultural buildings and structures on the National Register of Historic Places in California
Agricultural buildings and structures on the National Register of Historic Places
National Register of Historic Places in Santa Clara County, California
Companies based in Cupertino, California
Cupertino, California
1880 establishments in California